A whirligig is a punitive or torture contraption comprising a suspended cage-like device. The victim would be placed in the cage, which was spun violently in order to cause severe nausea.

Device 
The device used for a whirligig is a six-foot-high cylindrical cage connected to pivots from to top to bottom.

Punishment 
This was used as a military punishment, as by the British Army. For example, in Tangiers, the whirligig was reportedly used on women, by whom it was more feared than the pillory, stocks and wooden horse.

References

External links 

 Curious Punishments of Bygone Days at Getchwood 

Medieval instruments of torture
Modern instruments of torture
European instruments of torture